Tor Egil "Toro" Johansen (born 8 August 1950) is a retired Norwegian footballer.

He was born in Oslo. A midfielder with 52 caps and 7 goals for his country, he was even the national team captain in 14 matches during the 1970s.

Johansen played 327 matches for Skeid, of which 166 came in the Norwegian Premier League. He won the cup title in 1974 before getting signed by Lillestrøm SK in 1976. Spending two seasons with LSK, he would lift the two league titles as well as the 1977 cup title. The next year he returned to Skeid, finishing his career there.

References

1950 births
Living people
Norwegian footballers
Norway international footballers
Skeid Fotball players
Lillestrøm SK players

Association football midfielders
Footballers from Oslo